The 1973 Nantes mid-air collision occurred when two airliners travelling to London Heathrow airport hit each other over Nantes, France, on 5 March 1973. They were an Iberia McDonnell Douglas DC-9 flying from Palma de Mallorca to London and a Spantax Convair 990 from Madrid to London. All 68 people on board the DC-9 were killed. The CV-990 was able to make a successful emergency landing at Cognac – Châteaubernard Air Base.

Crash
Iberia flight 504, a scheduled service from Palma de Mallorca, and Spantax flight 400, a charter flight from Madrid, were both traversing France en route to Heathrow airport in London. They were guided by French military Air Traffic Control as the country's civilian air traffic controllers were on strike. The Iberia DC-9 was due to reach the Nantes VOR point at 12:52 at flight level 290 (29,000 feet) and the Spantax Convair CV-990 was scheduled to reach it at 13:00 at the same level.
Both aircraft had received instructions from Marina sector Air Traffic Control at the French Air Force base in Mont-de-Marsan, who asked them to contact Menhir sector ATC at the French Air Force base in Brest. The Spantax aircraft was on the boundary between the sectors and had difficulty hearing Marina ATC, also receiving no reply to two requests to circle to avoid arriving at the Nantes VOR before 13:00 GMT. The crew decided to start the manoeuvre without ATC authorisation and while in cloud collided with the Iberia DC-9 at 12:52 GMT. The DC-9 lost control, exploded, and broke up in mid-air before crashing to the ground. 

The CV-990 managed to land at Cognac – Châteaubernard Air Base with damage to its left wing. A survivor, Betty Barrett, later recounted: 

All 61 passengers and 7 crew of the Iberia flight were killed, including Michael Jeffery, the former manager of The Animals and Jimi Hendrix. 47 of the dead were British citizens. No-one aboard the Spantax flight was harmed.

Report
The accident was investigated by French air accident body, the Bureau d'Enquêtes et d'Analyses pour la Sécurité de l'Aviation Civile. Its report identified difficulties in communication between the flight crew of the Convair CV-990 and air traffic control as well as procedural errors from both parties. The crew's unilateral decision to turn the aircraft brought it into the path of the DC-9. ATC had assumed a time-based separation of the two aircraft at the same flight level.

In popular culture
The event is briefly mentioned in the MSNBC/The Weather Channel documentary series Why Planes Crash, during the first season episode "Collision Course". The episode features an interview with survivor Betty Barrett who shows images of the CV-990's damaged wing after landing.

See also
List of civilian mid-air collisions

References

External links

 Final accident report, Bureau d'Enquêtes et d'Analyses pour la Sécurité de l'Aviation Civile 
 HTML version (Archive)
 PDF version (Archive)
 English translation hosted by the Air Accidents Investigation Branch
 Report PDF (Archive)
 Appendices (Archive)

Aviation accidents and incidents in 1973
Accidents and incidents involving the McDonnell Douglas DC-9
Accidents and incidents involving the Convair 990 Coronado
Mid-air collisions
Mid-air collisions involving airliners
Aviation accidents and incidents in France
Iberia (airline) accidents and incidents
Spantax accidents and incidents
1973 in aviation
March 1973 events in Europe